M. Louise Gross (1884–1951) was secretary to New York City Tammany Hall district leader Thomas F. Foley, a close associate of Al Smith. She served in leadership positions in repeal of prohibition organizations including the Molly Pitcher Club, the Women's Moderation Union, and the Women's Committee for Modification of the Volstead Act. Following repeal, Gross became a registered lobbyist in Washington, D.C.

Education
Gross, a native New Yorker, graduated from White Plains High School before attending Fordham University where she studied law.

Political Activism

Prohibition
A Democrat, Gross lead supporters in anti-prohibition activities through the Molly Pitcher Club, a 'wet' organization that operated within the Association Against the Prohibition Amendment.

Sources

1884 births
1951 deaths
Women in New York (state) politics
Fordham University alumni